Will Daniels (born April 21, 1986) is an American professional basketball player for Trepça of the Kosovo Basketball Superleague. He played college basketball for Rhode Island.

Playing career
After playing four years (2004–2008) of college basketball at the University of Rhode Island, Will was undrafted in the 2008 NBA draft.

In 2008–09, he played with the Kavala B.C. in the Greek Basket League. He then started next season with another Greek team Peristeri B.C., but few months later moved to Bakersfield Jam of the NBA D-League.

After playing in D-League, Daniels returned overseas joining JSF Nanterre, where he spent next two seasons.

In June 2012, Daniels signed with Latvian team VEF Rīga. After a successful season in Latvia, Will moved back to JSF Nanterre, where he's debuted on Euroleague level.

In September 2014, he signed a one-year deal with Nizhny Novgorod of Russia. On November 14, 2014, he parted ways with Nizhny. In March 2015, he signed with Mets de Guaynabo of Puerto Rico for the 2015 BSN season.

On August 29, 2015, he signed with Limoges CSP for the 2015–16 season.

In November 2016, he signed with Al Mouttahed Tripoli.

In January 2017, he signed with Hapoel Eilat.

In June 2017, he signed with Piratas de Quebradillas.

On February 16, 2019, he has signed with Levallois Metropolitans of French LNB Pro A.

On May 20, 2021, Daniels returned to Piratas de Quebradillas. On October 21, Daniels signed with  Fethiye Belediyespor of the Turkish Basketball First League.

As of 2022, he is playing for Club Nacional of the Liga Uruguaya de Básquetbol.

EuroLeague career statistics

|-
| align="left" | 2013–14
| align="left" | Nanterre
| 10 || 10 || 21.2 || .448 || .385 || .655 || 4.7 || .7 || .6 || .5 || 11.5 || 10.2
|- class="sortbottom"
| align="left" | Career
| align="left" | 
| 10 || 10 || 21.2 || .448 || .385 || .655 || 4.7 || .7 || .6 || .5 || 11.5 || 10.2

References

External links
 Will Daniels at euroleague.net
 Will Daniels at eurobasket.com
 Will Daniels at draftexpress.com
 Will Daniels at realgm.com
 Will Daniels at nba.com
 Will Daniels at gorhody.com

1986 births
Living people
African-American basketball players
American expatriate basketball people in France
American expatriate basketball people in Greece
American expatriate basketball people in Israel
American expatriate basketball people in Latvia
American expatriate basketball people in Lebanon
American expatriate basketball people in Russia
American expatriate basketball people in Turkey
American men's basketball players
Bakersfield Jam players
BC Nizhny Novgorod players
BK VEF Rīga players
Hapoel Eilat basketball players
Kavala B.C. players
Limoges CSP players
Nanterre 92 players
Metropolitans 92 players
Peristeri B.C. players
Piratas de Quebradillas players
Rhode Island Rams men's basketball players
Forwards (basketball)
21st-century African-American sportspeople
20th-century African-American people